Robert MacLellan or Maclellan may refer to:
 Robert MacLellan (politician, born 1925) (1925–2011), member of the House of Commons of Canada
 Robert A. MacLellan (1882–1968), Canadian politician in the Nova Scotia House of Assembly
 Robert Maclellan, 1st Lord Kirkcudbright (died 1641), provost of Kirkcudbright known for his riotous (and violent) behavior
 Rob Maclellan (born 1934), Australian politician